Quadazocine (WIN-44,441) is an opioid antagonist of the benzomorphan family which is used in scientific research. It acts as a silent antagonist at all three of the major opioid receptors—μ, κ, and δ, but with a significant preference in affinity for the μ receptor and the κ2 subtype. As such, it has been touted as a "κ2-selective" antagonist, though this is not entirely accurate on account of its similar affinity for the μ receptor. As would be expected, quadazocine reverses the effects (e.g., analgesia) of opioid agonists like morphine and fentanyl in animals.

See also
 Dezocine

References

Benzomorphans
Cyclopentyl compounds
Delta-opioid receptor antagonists
Kappa-opioid receptor antagonists
Mu-opioid receptor antagonists